Steven Arthur Tobin (born March 29, 1957) is a former American football center who played for the New York Giants of the National Football League (NFL). He played college football at University of Minnesota.

References 

1957 births
Living people
People from Breckenridge, Minnesota
Players of American football from Minnesota
American football centers
Minnesota Golden Gophers football players
New York Giants players